Ramón López Soler (Manresa, 1806 – Barcelona, 1836) was a journalist and writer of the Spanish Romantic Movement. He died while very young, before developing a large body of original work. Along with Buenaventura Carlos Aribau, he founded the magazine El Europeo, which drew upon the collaborations of Englishman Ernesto Kook and Italians Luis Monteggia and Florencio Galli. The periodical exposed Spain to the panorama of European literature and helped introduce Romanticism, both in its Spanish manifestation and as it appeared across Germany, Italy, and England.

Bibliography
Ricardo Navas Ruiz, El Romanticismo español, Madrid: Cátedra, 1982, 3rd ed.

1806 births
1836 deaths
19th-century Spanish writers
People from Manresa
Spanish journalists
Spanish male writers
19th-century male writers